Norm McKenzie (born 21 October 1938) is a former  Australian rules footballer who played with South Melbourne in the Victorian Football League (VFL).. McKenzie was a master of the drop kick and the stab pass, something you don't see in the modern game. After retiring, McKenzie was coach of the Keilor Football Club and then later on as a Secretary/President.

Notes

External links 

Living people
1938 births
Australian rules footballers from Victoria (Australia)
Sydney Swans players
Daylesford Football Club players